Florian Hansch (born 22 August 1995) is a German footballer who plays as a forward for ZFC Meuselwitz.

References

External links
 Profile at kicker.de
 

Living people
1995 births
People from Zschopau
Association football forwards
German footballers
Chemnitzer FC players
FSV Budissa Bautzen players
SV Sandhausen players
SV Wehen Wiesbaden players
Hallescher FC players
VfB Auerbach players
ZFC Meuselwitz players
2. Bundesliga players
3. Liga players
Regionalliga players
Footballers from Saxony
21st-century German people